A health minister is the member of a country's government typically responsible for protecting and promoting public health and providing welfare and other social security services.

Some governments have separate ministers for mental health.

Country-related articles and lists 
 Albania: Ministry of Health (Albania)
 Argentina: Ministry of Health (Argentina)
 Australia: Minister for Health (Australia)
 Austria: Minister of Health (Austria)
 Azerbaijan: Ministry of Healthcare (Azerbaijan)
 Bhutan: Ministry of Health (Bhutan)
 Bahamas: Ministry of Health (Bahamas)
 Barbados: Ministry of Health and Wellness (Barbados)
 Belgium: Ministry of Public Health (Belgium)
 Bolivia: Ministry of Health (Bolivia)
 Botswana: Ministry of Health and Wellness (Botswana)
 Brazil: Ministry of Health (Brazil)
 Brunei: Ministry of Health (Brunei)
 Cambodia: Ministry of Health, Cambodia
 Canada: Minister of Health (Canada)
 Chile: Ministry of Health (Chile)
  People's Republic of China:
 Mainland China: Minister in charger of the National Health Commission
 formerly Minister of Health
  Hong Kong: Secretary for Food and Health
 Colombia: Ministry of Health and Social Protection (Colombia)
 Czech Republic: Ministry of Health (Czech Republic)
 Cyprus: Minister of Health (Cyprus)
 Denmark: Health Minister (Denmark)
 Ecuador: Minister of Health (Ecuador)
 European Union: European Commissioner for Health and Consumer Policy
 France: Minister of Health (France)
 Germany: Federal Minister for Health (Germany)
 Greece: Minister for Health and Social Solidarity (Greece)
 Guyana: Ministry of Health (Guyana)
 Iceland: Ministry of Welfare (Iceland)
 India: Ministry of Health and Family Welfare
 Indonesia: Ministry of Health (Indonesia)
Iran: Ministry of Health and Medical Education
 Iraq: Minister of Health (Iraq)
 Ireland: Minister for Health (Ireland)
 Israel: Ministry of Health (Israel)
 Italy: Ministry of Health (Italy)
 Japan: Minister of Health, Labour and Welfare (Japan) 
 Lithuania: Ministry of Health (Lithuania)
 Malaysia: Minister of Health (Malaysia)
 Mexico: Secretary of Health (Mexico)
 Myanmar: Ministry of Health and Sports (Myanmar)
 Netherlands: Minister of Health, Welfare and Sport
 New Zealand: Minister of Health (New Zealand)
 Nigeria: Federal Ministry of Health (Nigeria)
 North Macedonia: Ministry of Health (North Macedonia)
 Pakistan: Ministry of National Health Services Regulation and Coordination
 Peru: Ministry of Health (Peru)
: Secretary of Health or DOH Secretary
: Ministry of Health (Poland)
: Ministry of Health (Portugal)
 Russia: Ministry of Health (Russia)
 Singapore: Ministry of Health (Singapore)
: Minister of Health (South Africa)
 South Korea: Ministry of Health and Welfare (South Korea)
 Soviet Union: Ministry of Health (Soviet Union)
 Spain: Ministry of Health (Spain)
 Republic of China (Taiwan): Ministry of Health and Welfare (Republic of China)
 Thailand: Ministry of Public Health (Thailand)
: Ministry of Health (Turkey)
: Uganda Ministry of Health
: Ministry of Healthcare (Ukraine)
 United Kingdom:
 England: Secretary of State for Health, Minister of State for Health
 Northern Ireland (Pre-1972): Minister of Health and Local Government
 Scotland: Cabinet Secretary for Health and Wellbeing
 Wales: Welsh Government Minister for Health and Social Services
 Tanzania: Ministry of Health and Social Welfare, Tanzania
 Uruguay: Uruguayan Minister of Health
 United States: United States Secretary of Health and Human Services, United States Deputy Secretary of Health and Human Services
 Venezuela: Ministry of Health (Venezuela)
 Vietnam: Ministry of Health (Vietnam)

See also 

 Minister of Mental Health

 
 
Health
Health-related lists